Isabella Clara Eugenia (12 August 1566 – 1 December 1633), sometimes referred to as Clara Isabella Eugenia, was sovereign of the Spanish Netherlands in the Low Countries and the north of modern France with her husband, Archduke Albert VII of Austria. 

Their reign is considered the Golden Age of the Spanish Netherlands. Isabella was one of the most powerful women in 16th- and 17th-century Europe.

Early life

Childhood

Isabella Clara Eugenia of Austria was born in the Palacio del bosque de Valsaín, Segovia on 12 August 1566. She was the first surviving daughter of King Philip II of Spain and his third wife, Elisabeth of Valois. 

Her father was reportedly overjoyed at her birth and declared himself to be happier on the occasion than he would have been at the birth of a son. He already had a male heir, Carlos, Prince of Asturias, but due to the Prince’s mental illness and emotional instability, father and son had never developed a close rapport and frequently lived in conflict with one another.

Isabella was baptized by Juan Bautista Castaneo, apostolic nuncio, later Pope as Urban VII. Her godfather was her uncle John of Austria. She was named after her mother, the day of her birth, and the devotion to St. Eugenio, whose body her father had transferred the year before from Saint Dionysius of Paris to Toledo with her mother's help through her brother, the King of France.

A year later, Isabella's younger sister, Catalina, was born. Their parents were very close to their daughters, buying them jams, dolls, toys, and more. However, their mother miscarried a daughter in 1568 and died the same day.

Isabella and Catherine grew up beloved by her father and her stepmother, Anna of Austria, Philip's fourth wife. The sisters developed a close relationship. Their father ultimately fathered five children by Anna, all of whom died in early childhood except his heir, Philip.

Youth

Isabella and Catherine were raised under the care of Margarita de Cardona, their stepmother's lady-in-waiting, and some of their mother's own ladies-in-waiting, such as Claude de Vineulx. Both sisters were described as intelligent and well aware of their high social status.

Isabella had a very good education. Her studies presumably included good manners, mathematics, and the languages Dutch, French and Italian besides her native Spanish. Famous artist Sofonisba Anguissola, who served as court painter at the time, influenced the Infanta's artistic works. Isabella was the only person whom King Philip permitted to help him with his work, sorting his papers and translating Italian documents into the Spanish language for him.

Candidate to the French throne

After her maternal uncle, Henry III of France, was assassinated by the fanatical young monk Jacques Clément on 2 August 1589, Philip II claimed the French crown on Isabella's behalf despite France's Salic law, which forbade cognatic succession. 

At any rate, her mother had ceded any claim to the French crown with her marriage to the Spanish King. However, the Parlement de Paris, in power of the Catholic party, gave verdict that Isabella was "the legitimate sovereign" of France. The Huguenot leader, Henry III of Navarre, the actual heir by traditional French inheritance laws, ultimately made his claim to the throne, converted to Catholicism and was crowned in 1594.

Candidate to the English throne
Following the 1587 execution of Mary, Queen of Scots, Isabella was suggested as a Catholic candidate in the succession to Elizabeth I as she was a legitimate descendant of John of Gaunt (unlike the Tudors) and her father had been jure uxoris King of England.

Marriage proposals

As Infanta of Spain and Portugal, Isabella was quite eligible on the political marriage market, though she ended up marrying late for her time.

Engagement
At the age of two, Isabella was promised to marry her cousin Rudolf II, Holy Roman Emperor (18 July 1552 – 20 January 1612), son of her aunt Maria. However, Isabella had to wait for more than 20 years before the eccentric Rudolf declared that he had no intention of marrying anybody. Meanwhile, she served as her father's primary caretaker during the last three years of his life, when he was plagued by gout and frequent illness.

Marriage

Philip decided to cede the Spanish Netherlands to Isabella on condition that she marry her cousin, Albert VII, Archduke of Austria. He was her former fiancé's younger brother, the former Viceroy. They were to reign over the Netherlands jointly and be succeeded by their descendants according to the male-preference cognatic primogeniture but should a female succeed, she was required to marry the King of Spain or the person chosen by the King of Spain. It was stipulated that, should they have no children, the Netherlands would revert to the King of Spain upon the death of either spouse.

As Albert was the Archbishop of Toledo, he had to be released from his religious commitments by Pope Clement VIII before the wedding could take place. Shortly before Philip II died on 13 September 1598, he resigned the thrones of the Netherlands in favor of Isabella and her fiancé. The Pope celebrated the union by procuration on 15 November at Ferrera. On 18 April 1599, 33-year-old Isabella married Albert in Valencia. They had three children who died at a very young age, in 1605, 1607, and 1609.

Habsburg Netherlands

Beginning in 1601, the Archduke and Archduchess ruled the Habsburg Netherlands together. Their reign is a key period in the history of the Spanish Netherlands. After Albert's death, Isabella was appointed Governor of the Netherlands on the King of Spain's behalf.
 She was succeeded as Governor by Cardinal-Infante Ferdinand of Austria, the third son of her half-brother in 1633.

Foreign policy
The first half of Albert and Isabella's reign was dominated by war. After overtures to the United Provinces and to Queen Elizabeth I of England proved unsuccessful, the Habsburg policy in the Low Countries aimed at regaining the military initiative and isolating the Dutch Republic. The strategy was to force its opponents to the conference table and negotiate from a position of strength.

In pursuit of that goal and to get their political agenda to all Flemish social classes, Albert and Isabella used the most diverse media. Visual art, in the baroque style popularized in the wake of the Counter-Reformation, was the perfect tool. This, coupled with the political configuration of the period, made the Archduke's Court at Brussels one of the foremost political and artistic centers in Europe of that time. 

It became the testing ground for the Spanish Monarchy's European plans, a boiling pot full of people of all sorts: from artists and diplomats to defectors, spies and penitent traitors, from Spanish confessors, Italian counselors, Burgundian functionaries, English musicians, German bodyguards to the Belgian Nobles. Brussels became a vital link in the chain of Habsburg Courts and the diplomatic conduits between Madrid, Vienna, Paris, London, Lisbon, Graz, Innsbruck, Prague, and The Hague could be said to run through there.

The accession of James VI of Scotland as James I in England had paved the way for a separate peace with England. On 24 July 1604, England, Spain and the Archducal Netherlands signed the Treaty of London. The return to peace was severely hampered by differences over religion. Events such as the Gunpowder Plot caused a lot of diplomatic tension between London and Brussels, but the relations between the two courts tended to be cordial on the whole. Anne of Denmark wore her portrait in a locket as a public token of friendship and kinship.

The threat of diplomatic isolation and General Ambrogio Spínola's campaigns induced the Dutch Republic to accept a ceasefire in April 1609. The subsequent negotiations between the warring parties failed to produce a peace treaty, but led to the Twelve Years' Truce, agreed in Antwerp on 9 April 1609. Under the Truce's terms, the United Provinces were to be regarded as a sovereign power for the duration of the truce. After four decades of war, the treaty brought a period of much-needed peace to the Southern Netherlands.

Economy

The period of the Truce brought the Habsburg Netherlands a much-needed peace, mainly because the fields could be again worked in safety. The archducal regime encouraged reclamation of land that had been inundated in the course of the hostilities and sponsored the impoldering of De Moeren, a marshy area that is presently astride the Belgian–French border. 

The recovery of agriculture led in turn to a modest increase of the population (and thus workers) after decades of demographic losses. Industry and in particular the luxury trades likewise underwent a recovery, bringing considerable economic stability and prosperity to the Southern Netherlands.

However, international trade was hampered by the closure of the river Scheldt. The archducal regime had plans to bypass the blockade with a system of canals linking Ostend via Bruges to the Scheldt in Ghent and joining the Meuse to the Rhine between Venlo and Rheinberg. To combat urban poverty, the government supported the creation of a network of Monti di Pietà based on the Italian model.

Religion
 
The archducal regime ensured the triumph of the Catholic Reformation in the Habsburg Netherlands. Most Protestants had by that stage left the Southern Netherlands. After one last execution in 1597, those that remained were no longer actively persecuted. 

Under the terms of legislation passed in 1609, their presence was tolerated, provided they did not worship in public or engage in religious activities. The resolutions of the Third Provincial Council of Mechlin of 1607 were likewise given official sanction.

Through such measures and by the appointment of a generation of committed bishops, Albert and Isabella laid the foundation of the Catholic confessionalisation of the population. New and reformed religious orders enjoyed the particular support of the rulers. Although the Archduke had certain reservations about the order, the Jesuits received the largest cash grants, allowing them to complete their ambitious building programmes in Brussels and Antwerp. The Capuchins were given considerable sums as well. The foundation of the first convents of Discalced Carmelites in the Southern Netherlands depended wholly on the personal initiative of the archducal couple and bore witness to the Spanish orientation of their spirituality.

Legislative system
The reign of Albert and Isabella Clara Eugenia saw a strengthening of princely power in the Habsburg Netherlands. The States General of the loyal provinces were only summoned once in 1600. Thereafter, the government preferred to deal directly with the provinces.

The years of the Truce allowed the archducal regime to promulgate legislation on a whole range of matters. The so-called Eternal Edict of 1611, for instance, reformed the judicial system and ushered in the transition from customary to written law. Other measures dealt with monetary matters, the nobility, duels, gambling, etc.

Relationship with Spain
The actions of the two rulers stimulated the growth of a separate South Netherlandish identity. However, Albert and Isabella's children died at a very young age and as the years passed, it became clear that they would have no more offspring and thus independence wouldn't be possible.

After that, Albert and Isabella's goal became the reincorporation of the Southern Provinces into the Spanish monarchy. They consolidated the authority of the House of Habsburg over the territory of the Southern Netherlands and largely succeeded in reconciling previous anti-Spanish sentiments. As a result, the States of the loyal provinces swore to accept the King as heir of the Archduke and Archduchess in a number of ceremonies between May 1616 and January 1617.

After Albert's death in 1621, Isabella joined the Third Order of St Francis but continued to rule on behalf of her nephew, Philip IV. As Governess, Isabella alternated successes, such as that of the Capture of Breda in 1625, with failures and setbacks, such as the losses of 's-Hertogenbosch in 1629 and Maastricht in 1632. She died in Brussels in 1633.

Patronage of arts

Court of Brussels

Isabella and Albert stimulated the growth of the artistic movement of Flemish Baroque painting. Their patronage of such artists and architects as Peter Paul Rubens (their court painter since 1609), Wenceslas Cobergher, Jacob Franquart, Pieter Brueghel the Younger, the De Nole family, Otto van Veen, and many others made the Court of Brussels one of the foremost artistic centers in Europe of that time.

However, virtually nothing remains of Albert and Isabella's palace on the Coudenberg in Brussels, their summer retreat in Mariemont, or their hunting lodge in Tervuren. Their magnificent collections were scattered after 1633, and considerable parts of them have been lost. Still, the Archdukes enjoy a well-merited reputation as patrons of the arts. By far, the best preserved ensemble of art from the archducal period is to be found at Scherpenheuvel, where Albert and Isabella directed Cobergher, Theodoor van Loon, and the de Noles to create a pilgrimage church in a planned city.

Descalzas reales

For a month in 1598 Isabella had lived in the Convent of Las Descalzas Reales in Madrid, alongside her mother-in-law Maria. She continued to take an active interest in the convent, and donated major artworks to it, including a famous series of Brussels tapestries, designed by Rubens. These depict Isabella as the order's patron saint, "Clare of Assisi with Monstrance".

Rumors
A false anecdote links Isabella, the siege of Ostend, and the horse coat colour isabelline.

In popular culture
Isabella Clara Eugenia is a minor character in the alternate history 1632 series. She is most notable in the novel 1634: The Bavarian Crisis.
In the 2002 alternate history novel Ruled Britannia by Harry Turtledove, where the Armada has been successful, Isabella Clara Eugenia is temporarily made Queen of England.
In the 2007 film Elizabeth: The Golden Age, Isabella appeared in a minor role at the side of her father, Philip II of Spain, at the time of the attempted invasion of England by the Spanish Armada in 1588. The movie portrays Isabella as Philip's choice to replace Elizabeth on the throne of England. She was portrayed by actress Aimee King as a young girl rather than as the correct age of nineteen years.

Ancestry

References

Bibliography 

Cordula Van Wyhe (ed.), Isabel Clara Eugenia: Female Sovereignty in the Courts of Madrid and Brussels (Madrid and London, 2011).
Werner Thomas and Luc Duerloo (eds.), Albert & Isabella, 1598–1621: Essays (Turnhout, 1998).
Marie de Villermont, L'Infante Isabelle, Gouvernante des Pays-Bas (Paris, 1912).

|-

1566 births
1633 deaths
16th-century Spanish people
17th-century Spanish people
16th-century Spanish women
17th-century Spanish women
16th-century House of Habsburg
17th-century House of Habsburg
17th-century women rulers
People from Segovia
Spanish infantas
Portuguese infantas
Austrian princesses
Countesses
Governors of the Habsburg Netherlands
Poor Clares
17th-century Spanish nuns
Burials at the Cathedral of St. Michael and St. Gudula
Children of Philip II of Spain
Spanish people of Austrian descent
Castilian infantas
Aragonese infantas
Sofonisba Anguissola
People of the Spanish Netherlands
Daughters of kings
Female governors-general